The 1935 Saint Mary's Gaels football team was an American football team that represented Saint Mary's College of California during the 1935 college football season.  In their 15th season under head coach Slip Madigan, the Gaels compiled a 5–2–2 record and outscored their opponents by a combined total of 115 to 37.

Two Gaels received honors on the 1935 All-Pacific Coast football team: guard Marty Kordick (William H. Spaulding, 1st team); and center Wagner Jorgensen (Howard Jones, 1st team).

Schedule

References

Saint Mary's
Saint Mary's Gaels football seasons
Saint Mary's Gaels football